Presidential elections were held in the Orange Free State in February 1896. They were held after the former President Francis William Reitz resigned due to bad health in 1895. The two candidates were High Court judge Martinus Theunis Steyn and John G. Fraser. Whilst Steyn supported the proposed merger of the Orange Free State and Transvaal, Fraser was in favour of closer links with the neighbouring Cape Colony and the United Kingdom.

The election resulted in a convincing win for Steyn, who received 83% of the vote. He was inaugurated as President on 4 March 1896 at the Dutch Reformed Church in Bloemfontein.

Results

References

Orange
Elections in the Orange Free State
Presidential election